Voskresenskoye is a rural locality (a selo) in Yuldybayevsky Selsoviet, Zilairsky District, Bashkortostan, Russia. The population was 159 as of 2010. There are 3 streets.

Geography 
Voskresenskoye is located 50 km northeast of Zilair (the district's administrative centre) by road. Yuldybayevo is the nearest rural locality.

References 

Rural localities in Zilairsky District